Sonia Balassanian (born 1942) née Sonia Amirian, is an Iranian-born painter, sculptor, and curator, of Armenian ethnicity. She co-founded the Armenian Center for Contemporary Experimental Art. Balassanian lives in New York City and Yerevan.

Biography 
Sonia Balassanian was born in 1942 in Arak, Pahlavi Iran. In 1966, she emigrated to the United States. Balassanian attended the Pennsylvania Academy of the Fine Arts, where she received a BA degree (1970); and Pratt Institute, where she received a MFA degree (1978).  

In her early career she worked in installation art with sculptural elements, and later she worked in video art. She also worked on theater set design in New York City. In 1983, she was in the group exhibition, "Seven Women–Image Impact" at MoMA PS1, other artists included in the exhibition were Ana Mendieta, Anne Pitrone, Judy Rifka, Dena Shottenkirk, Susan Rothenberg, and Mimi Smith.

In 1992, she and her husband Edward Balassanian co-founded the Armenian Center for Contemporary Experimental Art. The center got its start with two seminal exhibitions, "The Show of the Nine" or "9" (1992), and "Identification" (1993).

Her work is found in the museum collection at the Tehran Museum of Contemporary Art. She has artist files at the Smithsonian American Art and Portrait Gallery Library.

See also 
 List of Armenian women artists
 List of Iranian women artists

References

External links 
 Official website

1942 births
Living people
People from Arak, Iran
Artists from New York City
Artists from Yerevan
Pennsylvania Academy of the Fine Arts alumni
Pratt Institute alumni
21st-century Armenian women artists
Armenian women curators
American women curators
Iranian people of Armenian descent